"Murderer's Muse" is the third track in GWAR's 2006 album Beyond Hell, following directly after War Is All We Know and featuring a similar musical style, with the main difference being that Oderus' vocals are more reminiscent of his style during the This Toilet Earth era and the use of samples from 1964 movie Evil Brain from Outer Space.

Relevance to Beyond Hell's plot
Following after GWAR's retreat from battle in War Is All We Know, Murderer's Muse details this escape as GWAR hide in the tunnels beneath their fortress, eventually coming across Jitler, a being created due to Adolf Hitler's crimes being so vast he had to merge with Jesus Christ as the song details "right at the ass".

References

Gwar songs
2006 songs